Avcıkoru Nature Park is a nature park located in Şile district of Istanbul Province, Turkey. 

Avcıkoru Nature Park is situated north of Ömerli Dam on the highway . The area was declared a nature park by the Ministry of Environment and Forest in 2011. The protected area is named after the village close to it. In the northwest of the nature park, there is an artificial pond formed by flooding of a mine pit.

Avcıkoru Nature Park offers outdoor recreational activities on daily basis such as hiking and picnicing. It features an outdoor cafeteria and cottages for lodging.

Ecosystem
Flora
The vegetation of the nature park are mostly wide-leaved trees. Some plants are pedunculate oak (Quercus robur), sessile oak (Quercus petraea), sweet chestnut (Castanea sativa), oriental beech (Fagus orientalis) and hornbeam (Carpinus betulus).

Fauna
Animals observed in the park area are the mammals roe deer, wild boar, squirrel, jackal, fox, marten and the bird species goldfinch, serinus, magpie, passer, common blackbird, hawk and common buzzard.

References

Nature parks in Turkey
Protected areas established in 2011
2011 establishments in Turkey
Parks in Istanbul
Şile